Confirmed is the second studio album by professional basketball player Damian Lillard, under the moniker Dame D.O.L.L.A., which stands for Different on Levels the Lord Allows. The album charted on number 72 of the Top Album Charts as well as on number 18 of the indie charts.

Track listing

References

2017 albums
Hip hop albums by American artists